Jacob Nellis Farmhouse is a historic home located at Nelliston in Montgomery County, New York.  It was built in the 1830s and is a rectangular, 1½-story, five-bay-long stone building with a three-bay lower 1½-story extension on the north side.  The house is in the Greek Revival style.  Also on the property is a small 19th-century barn and a large, multi-level 20th-century barn.

It was added to the National Register of Historic Places in 1980.

References

Houses on the National Register of Historic Places in New York (state)
Greek Revival houses in New York (state)
Houses completed in 1834
Houses in Montgomery County, New York
National Register of Historic Places in Montgomery County, New York